The 1927 Connacht Senior Football Championship the installment of the annual Connacht Senior Football Championship held under the auspices of Connacht GAA.

The winning team qualified for the 1927 All-Ireland Senior Football Championship.

Leitrim won their first title and their last until 1994.

Teams
The Connacht championship is contested by the five counties in the Irish province of Connacht.

Results

An objection was made and a replay ordered.

[Match abandoned following a disputed goal for Mayo after 12 minutes. Sligo withdrew from the championship and Mayo were awarded the tie.]

An objection was made and a replay ordered.

References

2C
Connacht Senior Football Championship